The Karpenko-Karyi State Museum-Reserve "Khutir Nadia" is a national historic site of Ukraine that was established on a territory of estate that belonged to Ivan Karpenko-Karyi, the playwright and theatrical figure of the late 19th - early 20th century.

History

Early days
The estate itself was founded in 1871 by the playwright's father Karpo Tobilevych and named in honor of his wife Nadiya Tarkovska. Later Karpenko-Karyi chose this estate as his permanent residence.

In the beginning Tobilevych family kept the estate as modest private farm. It was from that time that the "Father's Hut" and the old Chumak well have been preserved. After returning from three years of political exile in the spring of 1887, Ivan Karpenko-Karyi settled on the farm and decided to turn it into a picturesque corner of nature - in his own words "an oasis in the desert."

Soviet times
The Khutir Nadia was declared to be a state reserve museum in 1956. Since then the institution has been held by Kirovohrad Regional Museum. Many prominent figures of Ukrainian culture have celebrated its uniqueness, including Yuri Yanovsky, Petro Panch, Oles Honchar and Alexander Korneichuk.

In 1982, before the 100th anniversary of the Ukrainian theater luminaries, they restored the theatre that had been destroyed in 1944. On the eve of celebrating the 150th anniversary of the playwright they opened a new theater and literary and memorial exhibition.

Theatrical notability 

Tobilevich wrote 11 of his 18 plays at Khutir Nadia. This included "Sto tyciach" ("One hundred thousand"), "Hazyain" ("Master"), the historical drama "Sava Chaly," "Gandzya" and others.

At various times Mykola Sadovsky, Panas Saksahansky and M. Sadovska-Barilotti also lived in the manor.  Visitors included the artists Zanjkovetska, M.Kropyvnytsky, Starytsky and many other prominent theatrical figures, writers and artists.

Things to see 

The complex consists of Tobilevich father's house, a memorial building, the literary-memorial museum, a park, a landscape architecture area of 11 ha, a pond and a bust of Karpenko-Kary.  The traditional theater festival "The September gems" is regularly held here.

The museum holds about 2 thousand exhibits, many which belong to Tobylevych - Tarkovsky Arseny Aleksandrovich.

The cemetery of Karlyuzhynskii is nearby, where Ivan Karpovich and his family are buried.

The September Gems festival 

In 1970, during the celebration of Tobilevich's 125th anniversary, "The September Gems" annual theatre festival was inaugurated.  This has involved the greatest of modern Ukrainian writers and theater workers, and it became pan-Ukrainian in 1990.

Tourism 

Every year "Khutir Nadia" has more than 4,000 visitors from different regions of Ukraine and abroad.  It was nominated to be one of the Seven Wonders of Ukraine  although it did not make the final list.

Sources 
 Державний музей-заповідник І.Карпенка-Карого (Тобілевича) "Хутір Надія"
 Простіть, Андрію Юрійовичу, не вберегли...(An article about the destruction of "khutir Nadia" by a radical reconstruction)
 Приїжджайте на Хутір «Надія»!

References 

Museums in Kirovohrad Oblast
Literary museums in Ukraine
Historic house museums in Ukraine